Azarug Is a leftist youth organization of the Canary Islands founded in 1992 that seeks the independence of the archipelago. 

It defines itself as a leftist revolutionary pro-independence organization. Its principles include anti-imperialism, anticapitalism, ecologism, antimilitarism and feminism, as well as the strengthening of Canarian culture and identity (la difusión, fortalecimiento y defensa de los valores que constituyen la Identidad Nacional Canaria) by promoting Amazighism.   

It functions as an assembly-centered and horizontal organization, seeking to implement direct democracy and autogestion within its structure.

History 

Azarug was founded in Tenerife by uniting the youth wings of the National Congress of the Canaries (CNC) and the Popular Front of the Canary Islands (FREPIC-AWAÑAK), seeking to overcome the confrontation between these two political parties. Later members of other parties such as Izquierda Verde - Izegzawen joined Azarug. After the creation of a new island assembly in Gran Canaria the group became increasingly leftist, adding the socialist red star to its symbol. 

Although it disagrees with some of the policies of Antonio Cubillo, since Azarug does not condemn the past violent policies of the MPAIAC, it is viewed by rightists as one of the groups that seek to minimize terrorism in the Canary Islands.

See also
Canarian nationalism
List of active separatist movements in Africa

References

External links
 Página web de Azarug
Azarug, 20 años de lucha juvenil por la libertad del país
Anti-capitalist political parties
Canarian nationalist parties
Direct democracy parties
Feminist parties
Left-wing nationalist parties
Political parties established in 1992
Political parties in the Canary Islands
Socialist parties in Spain
Youth wings of political parties in Spain
Feminist organisations in Spain